An energy company is a company which operates within the energy industry, which can be involved in the production and sale of energy, including fuel extraction, manufacturing, refining and distribution. The companies listed below are traded on public stock exchanges, as such state owned energy companies, such as Aramco are not included. However Saudi Arabia’s deputy crown prince, Mohammed bin Salman, revealed plans to float 5% of the shares of Aramco, creating a publicly traded company with a market capitalisation of around $2 trillion.

The energy industry can be sub-divided into further, more specific areas - such as: the petroleum industry (oil companies, petroleum refiners, fuel transport and end-user sales at gas stations), gas and coal industry, as well as renewable energy companies. Also included are energy industry service companies as well as those which fall under the Energy service company umbrella.

Energy companies by Market Capitalization
 The following is a list of the top 10 energy companies ranked by Market Capitalization.
 Note, market capitalisation is taken from those shares traded on the NYSE, as indicated by the relevant ticker symbol.

See also
Energy industry
List of countries by energy consumption per capita

References